The Green Mile is a 1999 American fantasy drama film written and directed by Frank Darabont and based on Stephen King's 1996 novel of the same name. It stars Tom Hanks as a death row prison guard during the Great Depression who witnesses supernatural events following the arrival of an enigmatic convict (Michael Clarke Duncan) at his facility. David Morse, Bonnie Hunt, Sam Rockwell, and James Cromwell appear in supporting roles.

The film premiered on December 10, 1999, in the United States to positive reviews from critics, who praised Darabont's direction and writing, emotional weight, and performances (particularly for Hanks and Duncan), although its length received criticism. Since its release, the film has gained a reputation as one of the most emotionally touching films of all time. It was a commercial success, grossing $286 million from its $60 million budget, and was nominated for four Academy Awards: Best Picture, Best Supporting Actor for Duncan, Best Sound and Best Adapted Screenplay.

Plot

At a Louisiana assisted-living home in 1999, retiree Paul Edgecomb becomes emotional while viewing the film Top Hat. His companion Elaine becomes concerned, and Paul explains to her that the film reminded him of events that he witnessed when he was an officer at Cold Mountain Penitentiary's death row, nicknamed "The Green Mile".

In 1935, Paul supervised Corrections Officers Brutus "Brutal" Howell, Dean Stanton, Harry Terwilliger, and Percy Wetmore, reporting to Warden Hal Moores. Percy, the nephew of the state governor's wife, demonstrates a sadistic streak but flaunts his family connections to avoid being held accountable. He is particularly abusive towards prisoner Eduard "Del" Delacroix, killing his pet mouse, Mr. Jingles.

Paul is introduced to John Coffey, a physically imposing but mild-mannered black man sentenced to death after being convicted of raping and murdering two young white girls. He joins Del and another condemned convict: Arlen Bitterbuck, the first to be executed. The officers are forced to deal with psychotic new inmate William "Wild Bill" Wharton, who frequently causes trouble by assaulting the officers and racially abusing John, forcing them to restrain him in the block's padded cell on more than one occasion.

After John heals Paul's severe bladder infection by touching him, and later resurrects Mr. Jingles, Paul gradually realizes that John possesses a supernatural ability to heal others. Paul doubts whether someone with the power to perform divine miracles is truly guilty of the crime.

In exchange for resigning from the penitentiary and accepting a job at an insane asylum, Percy is allowed to oversee Del's execution. At the execution, Percy deliberately avoids soaking the sponge used to conduct electricity to Del's head, leading to Del suffering a gruesome and agonizing death, with John forced to feel Del's pain as well. Paul and the other officers punish Percy by forcing him to spend a night in the padded cell. While Percy is locked away, they secretly smuggle John out of the prison so that he can use his powers to heal Warden Moores' wife Melinda of a brain tumor, saving her life. After Percy is released from the padded room, the others threaten to report him for his various acts of misconduct if his behavior continues.

John uses his powers to "release" Melinda's affliction into Percy's brain, causing Percy to shoot Wild Bill to death. Soon after, John reveals in a vision to Paul that Wild Bill was the true culprit of the crimes for which he was wrongfully condemned, releasing his supernatural energy into Paul in the process. Having suffered a mental breakdown, Percy is committed to the same insane asylum where he had planned to work after resigning from the prison.

After realizing that John is innocent, Paul is distraught at the thought of executing him and offers to let him go free. John tells Paul that the execution would be an act of mercy, as he views the world as a cruel place and is in constant pain from the suffering that people inflict upon each other. Mentioning that he has never seen a movie before, John watches Top Hat with the other officers as his last request. When he is taken to be executed, he asks not to have a hood placed over his head as he is afraid of the dark. The officers watch in sadness, visibly holding back tears as Coffey is executed. Back in the present, Paul tells Elaine that John's execution was the last that he and Brutal witnessed, as they both subsequently resigned from the prison and took jobs in the juvenile system.

Paul reveals to Elaine that Mr. Jingles is still alive, having been blessed with a supernaturally long life thanks to John's healing touch. He also reveals that he is now 108 years old. While Elaine sees Paul's long life as another of John's miracles, Paul speculates that he may have been condemned to linger on Earth and outlive all of his loved ones as a divine punishment for executing John. Paul is later shown attending Elaine's funeral and muses on how much longer he has left to live.

Cast

Production

Development
Darabont adapted Stephen King's novel, The Green Mile, into a screenplay in under eight weeks.

The film was shot at Warner Hollywood Studios, West Hollywood, California, and on location in Shelbyville, Tennessee, Blowing Rock, North Carolina and the old Tennessee State Prison. The interior sets were custom built by production designer Terence Marsh. "We tried to give our set a sense of space. A sense of history. And a sense of mystery, in a way. We chose the elongated cathedral-like windows because there is a very mystical element in this movie, a supernatural element [...] It presented us with lots of opportunities", he said. The electric chair was also a bespoke design, and was inspired by real prisons which have the device. 

The film title refers to the stretch of green floor that the hallway inmates walk down before they are to be executed by electric chair.

Casting
Hanks and Darabont met at an Academy Award luncheon in 1994. Stephen King stated he envisioned Hanks in the role and was happy when Darabont mentioned his name. Hanks was originally supposed to play elderly Paul Edgecomb as well, but the makeup tests did not make him look credible enough to be an elderly man. Because of this Greer was hired to play the older Edgecomb, his final film role. John Travolta was offered the role of Paul Edgecomb but turned it down.

Duncan credited his casting to Bruce Willis, with whom he had worked on the film Armageddon one year earlier. According to Duncan, Willis introduced him to Darabont after hearing of the open call for John Coffey. Basketball player Shaquille O'Neal was offered the role of John Coffey but turned it down. Josh Brolin was considered for the role of William "Wild Bill" Wharton.

Morse had not heard about the script until he was offered the role. He stated he was in tears by the end of it. Darabont wanted Cromwell from the start, and after he read the script, Cromwell was moved and agreed.

Soundtrack
The official film soundtrack, Music from the Motion Picture The Green Mile, was released on December 19, 1999, by Warner Bros. It contains 37 tracks, primarily instrumental tracks from the film score by Thomas Newman. It also contains four vocal tracks: "Cheek to Cheek" by Fred Astaire, "I Can't Give You Anything but Love, Baby" by Billie Holiday, "Did You Ever See a Dream Walking?" by Gene Austin, and "Charmaine" by Guy Lombardo and His Royal Canadians.

Release

Box office
In the United States and Canada, The Green Mile opened on December 10, 1999, in 2,875 theaters and grossed $18 million in its opening weekend, placing second at the box office, just behind Toy Story 2 with $18.2 million, however, it finished first for the week with $23.9 million compared to Toy Story 2 $22.1 million for the week. It remained at number two in its second weekend and in the top 10 for 10 weeks but never reached number one for the weekend. It went on to gross $136.8 million in the U.S. and Canada and $150 million in other territories, bringing a worldwide total of $286.8 million, against its production budget of $60 million. It was the second highest-grosser in Japan for the year with a gross of $55.3 million.

Reception

Critical response
On Rotten Tomatoes the film holds an approval rating of 79% based on 136 reviews with an average rating of 6.80/10. The website's critics consensus states, "Though The Green Mile is long, critics say it's an absorbing, emotionally powerful experience." At Metacritic the film has a weighted average score of 61 out of 100, based on 36 critics, indicating "generally favorable reviews". Audiences polled by CinemaScore gave the film an average grade of "A" on an A+ to F scale.

Film critic Roger Ebert gave the film three and a half out of four stars, writing, "The film is a shade over three hours long. I appreciated the extra time, which allows us to feel the passage of prison months and years ... it tells a story with beginning, middle, end, vivid characters, humor, outrage and emotional release". Writing for Entertainment Weekly, Lisa Schwarzbaum also took note of the film's length, but praised Tom Hanks' "superior" performance and Darabont's direction. "Darabont's style of picture making is well matched to King-size yarn spinning. The director isn't afraid to let big emotions and grand gestures linger", she said. 

San Francisco Chronicle's Edward Guthmann thought the cinematography was "handsome", and the music was "florid and melodramatic". He added, "Darabont is such a committed filmmaker, and believes so earnestly and intensely in the stories he puts onscreen". Desson Thomson of The Washington Post called the storytelling "brilliant", and said "From its deceptively easygoing beginning to the heart-wrenching finale, The Green Mile keeps you wonderfully high above the cynical ground."

Conversely, some critics had a less positive response. Kirk Honeycutt of The Hollywood Reporter opined, "By inflating the simple story with a languorous pace, pregnant pauses, long reaction shots and an infinitely slow metabolism, Darabont has burdened his movie version with more self-importance than it can possibly sustain." While complimenting the production design and soundtrack, the critic from Timeout magazine thought some scenes were tiresome and the film "suffers from a surfeit of plot threads and characters". 

Writing for the BBC, Clark Collis took issue with some of the plot's unrealistic elements and thought the film was too long. David Ansen of Newsweek thought The Green Mile was weaker than Darabont's previous film, The Shawshank Redemption (1994). He stated, The Green Mile is a "lumbering, self-important three-hour melodrama that defies credibility at every turn".

Accolades

Home media
The film was released on VHS and DVD on June 13, 2000. The film earned $17.45 million in combined DVD and VHS rental revenue by June 18, 2000. 

The Blu-ray was released on December 1, 2009. That version is now out of print. The 4K Blu-ray was released on February 22, 2022.

Notes

References

External links

 
 
 
 

1990s American films
1990s English-language films
1990s prison drama films
1999 crime drama films
1999 drama films
1999 films
American crime drama films
American fantasy films
American prison drama films
Castle Rock Entertainment films
Films about capital punishment
Films about mice and rats
Films about miscarriage of justice
Films about old age
Films about rape
Films about racism in the United States
Films based on works by Stephen King
Films directed by Frank Darabont
Films produced by David Valdes
Films scored by Thomas Newman
Films set in 1935
Films set in 1999
Films set in Louisiana
Films set in prison
Films shot in California
Films shot in North Carolina
Films shot in Tennessee
Films with screenplays by Frank Darabont
Great Depression films
Magic realism films
Universal Pictures films
Warner Bros. films